Arturo Osvaldo Aranda Barreto (born 20 November 1998) is a Paraguayan professional footballer who plays as a central midfielder for Club Libertad.

External links

1998 births
Living people
Association football defenders
Paraguayan footballers
Club Libertad footballers
Sportspeople from Asunción
Footballers at the 2015 Pan American Games
Pan American Games competitors for Paraguay